Carnegie Museums of Pittsburgh are four museums that are operated by the Carnegie Institute headquartered in the Carnegie Institute complex in the Oakland neighborhood of Pittsburgh, Pennsylvania. The Carnegie Institute complex, which includes the original museum, recital hall, and library, was added to the National Register of Historic Places on March 30, 1979.

Portfolio
Two of the Carnegie museums, the Carnegie Museum of Natural History and the Carnegie Museum of Art, are both located in the Carnegie Institute and Library complex in Oakland, a landmark building listed on the National Register of Historic Places (ref #79002158, added 1979). It also houses the Carnegie Music Hall and the main branch of the Carnegie Library of Pittsburgh. 

 
Andrew Carnegie donated the library and the buildings. With the goal of inspiring people to do good for themselves and their communities, the terms for donations required communities to support them in exchange for the building and initial investment by Carnegie. The words "free to the people" inscribed above the entrance of the Carnegie Library of Pittsburgh illustrate his vision. The other two museums, The Andy Warhol Museum and the Carnegie Science Center, are located in separate facilities on Pittsburgh's North Shore.

Andy Warhol Museum

 Opened on May 15, 1994, the Andy Warhol Museum is the first museum to exclusively focus on an American postwar artist. Warhol's affect was the silkscreen pop art, which he gained notoriety for in the early 1960s. The serial images derived from the culture's consumerism and conception of beauty are reified in a form of art which represent the identity of constituents in postwar American society. Images used by Warhol and his contributions to pop art include celebrities and consumables such as: Marilyn Monroe and The Campbells soup can, et al. The museum's collection includes over 4,000 Warhol art works in all media - paintings, drawings, prints, photographs, sculptures, and installation; the entire Andy Warhol Video Collection, 228 four-minute Screen Tests, and 45 other films by Warhol; and extensive archives, including Warhol's Time Capsules. While dedicated to Andy Warhol, the museum also hosts many exhibits by contemporary artists. Similar to the museum in Pittsburgh, The Whitney Museum of American Art, New York, celebrates Warhol's art in relevant fashion with a vast collection of art and holds events for contemporary artists as well. Both cities are central to his influence on art. Andy Warhol was born in Pittsburgh; he had moved to New York after graduating art school and transgressed from pop artist to art icon. The nation experienced deep and radical cultural change in the 1960s and Warhol's art was aligned with the movement.

Carnegie Museum of Art

When Andrew Carnegie envisioned a museum collection consisting of the "Old Masters of tomorrow", the Carnegie Museum of Art became, arguably, the first museum of modern art in the United States.  Founded in 1895, today it continues showcasing contemporary art by staging the Carnegie International exhibition every few years. Numerous works from the International exhibitions have been acquired for the museums' permanent collection including Winslow Homer's The Wreck (1896) and James A. McNeill Whistler's Arrangement in Black: Portrait of Señor Pablo de Sarasate (1884). The marble Hall of Sculpture replicates the interior of the Parthenon. The Hall of Architecture contains the largest collection of plaster casts of architectural masterpieces in America and one of the three largest in the world. Opened in 1974, the Sarah Scaife Galleries Annex, was designed by Edward Larrabee Barnes and Associates. The Sarah Scaife Foundation gift nearly doubled the exhibition square footage. The modernist addition was designed to not compete with the existing building. "Trustee James L. Winokur says of architect Edward Larrabee Barnes, "He kept the old building out front. He was not terribly concerned about getting credit, just concerned about doing the job right, and he did do it right."

The Heinz Architectural Center, opened as part of the museum in 1993, is dedicated to the collection, study, and exhibition of architectural drawings and models. In 2001 the museum acquired the archive of African-American photographer Charles "Teenie" Harris, consisting of approximately 80,000 photographic negatives spanning from the 1930s to the 1970s. Many of these images have been cataloged and digitized and are available online via the Carnegie Museum of Art Collections Search.

The museum's permanent collection includes European and American decorative arts from the late seventeenth century to the present, works on paper, paintings, prints (notably Japanese prints), sculptures and installations.

Carnegie Museum of Natural History

From the holotype of Diplodocus carnegii to the most complete Tyrannosaurus rex known to date and Anzu wyliei, a recently described oviraptorosaur, the Carnegie Museum of Natural History displays 230 dinosaur fossils.  Other exhibits include Hillman Hall of Minerals and Gems, Alcoa Foundation Hall of American Indians, Polar World: Wyckoff Hall of Arctic Life, Walton Hall of Ancient Egypt, and Benedum Hall of Geology. The museum's Powdermill Nature Reserve was established in 1956 to serve as a field station for long-term studies of natural populations, and now forms the core of the museum's Center for Biodiversity and Ecosystems.  Research teams including Carnegie scientists have made discoveries such as Puijila darwini, Castorocauda lutrasimilis, and Hadrocodium wui.

Carnegie Science Center

Opened in 1991, but with a history that dates to October 24, 1939, the Carnegie Science Center is the most visited museum in Pittsburgh.  The Carnegie Science Center houses the Buhl Planetarium, the Rangos Omnimax Theater, SportsWorks, the Miniature Railroad & Village, the USS Requin, a World War II submarine, Bricksburgh, H20h!, and SpacePlace, and Roboworld.

On February 21, 1990, Pennsylvania Senator John Heinz introduced Senate Bill S. 2151, which allowed the USS Requin to be transferred as an exhibit for the Carnegie Science Center. The purpose of the exhibit is for visitors to learn how people lived and worked on the boat.   

The Buhl Planetarium and Carnegie Science Center merged in 1987 and in October 1989, the organizations broke ground on the new Carnegie Science Center building.

References

External links

Andy Warhol Museum
Carnegie Museum of Art
Carnegie Museum of Natural History
Carnegie Science Center

Andrew Carnegie
Pittsburgh History & Landmarks Foundation Historic Landmarks
Museum organizations
Museums in Pittsburgh
Individually listed contributing properties to historic districts on the National Register in Pennsylvania
National Register of Historic Places in Pittsburgh